A location routing number (LRN) is an identification for a telephone switch for the purpose of routing telephone calls through the public switched telephone network (PSTN) in the United States. This identification has the format of a telephone number, in accordance with the North American Numbering Plan (NANP). The association of a location routing number with a telephone number is required for local number portability.

Function
In the US, the location routing number is a ten-digit number following the specifications of the North American Numbering Plan. The LRN is stored in a database called a Service Control Point (SCP) that identifies a switching port for a local telephone exchange. Using LRN, when a telephone number has been dialed, the local telephone exchange queries or "dips" a routing database, usually the SCP, for the LRN associated with the subscriber number. The LRN removes the need for the public telephone number to identify the local exchange carrier. If a subscriber changes to another telephone service provider, the current telephone number can be retained, and only the LRN needs to be changed.
In addition to supporting service provider telephone number portability, an LRN also supports the possibility of two other types of number portability: service portability (for example, ordinary service to ISDN) and geographic portability.

History
In 1996, the US Congress mandated a change in local telephone service that allows any carrier to enter a local market. The new regulation provided for local number portability (LNP), which permitted the servicing of telephone numbers from other wire centers than that the given by the NPA-NXX prefixes of each number. In practice, a subscriber can keep a telephone number when moving to another exchange area by a process called porting a telephone number. Every ported telephone number has an LRN assigned.

Virginia-based NeuStar has been contracted with developing and maintaining the Number Portability Administration Center (NPAC) to support the implementation of local number portability. On March 26, 2015, the FCC approved the recommendation of the North American Numbering Council (NANC) to award the contract to Telcordia Technologies, doing business as iconectiv, as the next Local Number Portability Administrator (LNPA), after 18 years of management by Neustar.[4][5] The reasons for the change were cited as cost savings.[6] With commission oversight, North American Portability Management, LLC (NAPM) negotiated the terms of a Master service agreement (MSA) with iconectiv.[4][6] The MSA was submitted to the FCC for review and approval in March 2016.[7] The iconectiv contract was finalized in August 2016.[8] iconectiv officially became the administrator of the NPAC on May 25, 2018.[9]

See also
 Signalling System No. 7

References

External links
 http://www.nanc-chair.org/docs/nowg/Nov03_LRN_Cites_Document.doc

Telephone numbers